Jean Boyer (born 4 January 1937) at  Puy-en-Velay (Haute-Loire), is a French politician, member of The Centrists.

Biography 

Boyer was born in  Blanzac, near Saint-Paulien (Haute-Loire), he began in the 1970s a career as a local elected representative. Mayor of  Blanzac from  1971 to  1995. In  1979 he became the  general counsel of canton of Saint-Paulien. Then, in  1985, he became the vice-president of the General Council of Haute-Loire, then chaired by the  centrist Jacques Barrot (UDF –  CDS). He was also a member of the regional council of Auvergne from 1986 to 1998.

In addition to his political activities, he holds various positions within the professional agricultural organizations. Vice-president of the Mutualité sociale agricole (1983), president of the Conservatoire botanique national du Massif Central of Chavaniac-Lafayette (1996–2003), he was appointed in 1996 member of the  Economic, Social and Environmental Council, of which he chairs the agriculture section and food until 2001.

Candidate  DVD in the 2001 senatorial elections, he defeated the outgoing Guy Vissac (RPR) and becomes a senator from Haute-Loire. At the  Senate, he specializes in agricultural issues and joins the group of the Centrist Union (UC), of which he was elected vice-president. In 2011, after having given up the vice-presidency of the General Council, he announced his intention to run for a new parliamentary mandate. He was re-elected senator and elected secretary of the Senate in October 2011.

Member of the  New UDF in the 2000s, he subsequently joined The Centrists, and in 2010 participated in the founding of the federation of Haute-Loire of the Centrist party.

Jean Boyer is a knight of the Legion of Honor, an officer of the Ordre national du Mérite and commander of the  Mérite agricole.

He announced in January 2014 his intention to leave the Senate on the following 1 October to allow the election of his deputy, Olivier Cigolotti.

References

Page on the Senate website

People from Le Puy-en-Velay
1937 births
Living people
French Senators of the Fifth Republic
Chevaliers of the Légion d'honneur
Union of Democrats and Independents politicians
Senators of Haute-Loire